The 1997 London Marathon was the 17th running of the annual marathon race in London, United Kingdom, which took place on Sunday, 13 April. The elite men's race was won by Portugal's  António Pinto in a time of 2:07:55 hours and the women's race was won by Kenya's Joyce Chepchumba in 2:26:51. 

In the wheelchair races, Britain's David Holding (1:42:15) and Sweden’s Monica Wetterstrom won the men's and women's divisions, respectively. Grey’s winning time was a course record by a margin of more than 19 hours (and the first woman to win by default).

Around 78,000 people applied to enter the race, of which 39,813 had their applications accepted and 29,500 started the race. A total of 29,189 runners finished the race.

Results

Men

Women

Wheelchair men

Wheelchair women

References

Results
Results. Association of Road Racing Statisticians. Retrieved 2020-04-19.

External links

Official website

1997
London Marathon
Marathon
London Marathon